The Ephraim Ponder House in Thomasville, Georgia, also known as the Sholar House, was built c.1854-56  It was listed on the National Register of Historic Places in 1970.

It was built by Epraim Ponder, and served part of old Young's Female College in Thomasville in 1869 and latterly as home of the president of the old College.  At the time of NRHP listing it was owned by John Sholar and wife.

Its south facade is Greek Revival in style and faces the former Female College property.

References

Houses on the National Register of Historic Places in Georgia (U.S. state)
Houses completed in 1854
Houses in Thomas County, Georgia
National Register of Historic Places in Thomas County, Georgia